The Swiftsure 33 is a Dutch sailboat that was designed by American naval architect Philip Rhodes as cruiser and first built in 1959.

Production
The design was initially built by de Vries Lentsch and later by Royal Netherlands Aircraft, both in the Netherlands, from 1959 until 1965, with 150 boats completed. It was imported into the United States by Seafarer Yachts.

Design
The Swiftsure 33 is a recreational keelboat, built predominantly of fiberglass, with wood trim. It has a masthead sloop rig; a spooned, raked stem; a raised counter, angled transom; a keel-hung rudder controlled by a tiller and a modified, fixed, long keel, with a cutaway forefoot and a retractable centerboard. It displaces  and carries  of ballast.

The boat is fitted with a Universal Atomic 4  gasoline engine for docking and maneuvering.

The design has sleeping accommodation for six people, with a double "V"-berth in the bow cabin and two straight settee berths and two pilot berths in the main cabin around a dining table. The galley is located on both sides of the companionway ladder. The galley is equipped with a two-burner stove and a sink to port and an ice box to starboard. The head is located just aft of the bow cabin on the port side and includes a sink.

The design was built in two different models, the Swiftsure 33 and the Commodore Swiftsure, with different trim and slightly different displacements and ballast. The earlier boats built by deVries Lentch have a fixed main cabin table that is permanently fixed in place, with drop-leaves. The table has a vertical hollow steel tube  running though the aft end, which houses the centerboard control cable. In the later Commodore Swiftsure model, mostly built by Royal Netherlands Aircraft, the table folds and stows away and the centerboard control cable is routed though the port cabin cabinets.The earlier boats have bronze deck hardware, while the Commodore Swiftsure model has a mix of stainless steel and aluminum hardware, with teak trim.

See also
List of sailing boat types

References

External links

Keelboats
1950s sailboat type designs
Sailing yachts
Sailboat type designs by Philip Rhodes
Sailboat types built by De Vries Lentsch
Sailboat types built by Royal Netherlands Aircraft